Signal-induced proliferation-associated 1-like protein 2 is a protein that in humans is encoded by the SIPA1L2 gene.

References

Further reading